Mykolaitis is a Lithuanian-language patronymic surname derived from the given name Mykolas (Nicholas). Notable people with the surname include:

Povilas Mykolaitis (born 1983), Lithuanian long jumper
Saulius Mykolaitis (1966 – 2006), Lithuanian director, actor, and singer-songwriter
Vincas Mykolaitis (1893-1967),  Lithuanian poet and writer

, Lithuanian film actress and model

Lithuanian-language surnames
Patronymic surnames